Andropogon distachyos is a species of perennial herb in the family Poaceae (true grasses). They have a self-supporting growth form and simple, broad leaves. Individuals can grow to 62 cm.

Sources

References 

distachyos
Grasses of Europe
Flora of Southwestern Europe
Flora of Malta